The Church of Jesus Christ of Latter-day Saints in Turkey refers to the Church of Jesus Christ of Latter-day Saints (LDS Church) and its members in Turkey. As of December 31, 2021, the Church has 573 members and 8 branches in several cities in Turkey. The Church has branches in İstanbul (English and Turkish), Ankara (English, Turkish, and Persian), İzmir (English and Turkish), Adana (English), Gaziantep (Turkish), Isparta (Persian), and Antalya (Turkish).

History 

Latter-day saint British soldiers met in Turkey in May 1854. The first Latter-day Saint sent by the church was Jacob Spori who arrived in Constantinople on December 31, 1854. Shortly after, on January 4, 1885, Hadop and Philimae Vartooguain and their two children, Sisak and Armais, were baptized. The first group meeting was held on January 18, 1885.

Missionaries were sent to Aintab in April 1889 with a branch being established soon after. A church school was established in Antiab in the fall of 1898. The Book of Mormon was translated into Turkish in 1906. Due to hostilities, members were evacuated on September 16, 1921.

In the 1950s US military presence allowed serviceman's groups to meet throughout the country. The first congregation since the 1921 evacuation was organized in Ankara in October 1979. Some of the first native Turks to join the Church were baptized in the late 1980s in Germany. Turkey became part of the newly created Europe/Mediterranean Area in 1991. In 2000, Turkey became part of the Europe East Area.

The Church became legally recognized by the government in October 2011 and in February 2012 the church held its first church services and full-time missionaries from the Bulgaria Sofia Mission were assigned to Istanbul to begin proselyting. In 2014, there were 12 young missionaries (six in Ankara and six in Istanbul) and four missionary couples. Elder Dale G. Renlund visited Istanbul, Turkey in 2019.

Humanitarian Efforts 
As of 2019, 633 humanitarian related projects were completed by the LDS Church, including 520 community projects, 74 wheelchair donation initiatives, 20 refugee response efforts, 12 emergency response initiatives, four maternal and newborn care projects, and three clean water initiatives. In 1991, 13,000 blankets, 80,000 pounds of clothing, and funds for medical supplies were sent by the church to Kurdish refugees in Turkey. The Church donated $50,000 to earthquake relief in 1999. In 2009, LDS Charities donated tables, chairs, and toys to a needy school in a village outside of Ankara and school supplies in other areas. The Church donated emergency supplies and hygiene kits to victims of a flash flood near Istanbul in 2009.

Stakes and congregations
All congregations are not part of a stake or district but directly part of the Europe East Area. As of February 2023, congregations include:
Adana Military Branch
Ankara Branch
Antalya Branch
Bulgaria/Central Eurasian Mission 1st Branch (Serves families and individuals not in proximity to a meetinghouse)
Isparta Branch
Istanbul 1st Branch
Istanbul 2nd Branch (English)
Izmir Branch

Missions
On July 1, 2015, the Central Eurasian Mission was created from the Bulgaria Sofia and Russia Novosibirsk Missions with its mission office located in Istanbul, Turkey. In April 2018, Bulgaria was added to the mission and it was renamed the Bulgarian Central Eurasian Mission. Its offices were moved to Sofia, Bulgaria. In At the end of April 2018, all the missionaries were removed from Turkey and assigned elsewhere. Boundaries for this mission include Azerbaijan, Bulgaria, Tajikistan, Turkey, Turkmenistan, and Uzbekistan.

Temples
The closest temples to Turkey are the Rome Italy Temple and the Kyiv Ukraine Temple. Church President Russell M. Nelson has announced that temples will be built in Russia, Dubai and Hungary.

See also 
Christianity in Turkey
Religion in Turkey

References

External links 
 Website of the LDS Church in Turkey (in Turkish)
 Detailed Information about the LDS Church in Turkey (in English)
 Some Statistics of the LDS Church in Turkey (in English)

Christianity in Turkey
Turkey